Lake Tennyson (elevation ) is a glacial high-country lake in Canterbury, New Zealand. The first European settler to see the lake was Frederick Weld in 1853, who also named it. The headwaters of the Waiau Toa / Clarence River are just to the north, and the river flows through Lake Tennyson.

History

Lake Tennyson was discovered by Frederick Weld in 1853; Weld was the inaugural member of parliament for the  electorate. The nearby Mount Weld is named for Weld, who climbed the mountain in March 1855. The reason for Weld exploring the area was his search for an overland route between Nelson and Canterbury for driving sheep. The lake is assumed to be named for the poet Alfred, Lord Tennyson. Weld described the lake as follows:

Description

A broad moraine with a number of tarns (i.e. mountain pools) forms the downstream side of the lake. There is a basic camp ground provided by the Department of Conservation next to the lake, free to use on a first come, first served basis.

Location

Lake Tennyson is located within the headwaters of the Clarence River; the river flows through the lake. Lake Tennyson is framed by the St James Range to the west, and the Crimea Range to the east.

Lake Tennyson is part of Molesworth Station, New Zealand's largest farm. Access from Hanmer Springs is on Clarence Valley Road via Jacks Pass, and then Tophouse Road along the Clarence River to the Maling Pass car park. The Clarence River is crossed via bridge at the car park and after a short drive on the Rainbow Road, the access road to the lake is signposted on the left. This route is suitable for two-wheel drives.

The alternative access is from Saint Arnaud. Just east of the township, the route turns right off State Highway 63 onto Rainbow Road (also known as Wairau–Hanmer Springs Hydro Road). This road is suitable for four-wheel drives only, has seasonal access restrictions, and a toll applies that is payable at Rainbow Station.

The Maling Pass car park in close proximity to Lake Tennyson is the most common start point for those who want to explore the St James Cycle Trail.

Notes

References

Lakes of Canterbury, New Zealand
Hurunui District